Taureano Dexter Johnson (variously known as Tureano, Toureano, Taureno, or Jhonson; born 12 February 1984) is a Bahamian professional boxer who held the WBC Silver middleweight title in 2015. As an amateur he qualified for the 2008 Olympics.

Amateur career
At the PanAm Games 2007 he lost to Diego Chaves 6:9. He rose to prominence with his effort against PanAm Champion Pedro Lima at the first Olympic qualifier where he lost a close bout. At the second qualifier he won the rematch 10:6 and qualified. He trains in Cuba under the guidance of coach Jesus Yu.

Professional career

Johnson vs Castaneda 
On February 9, 2019, Johnson faced Fernando Castaneda. The fight ended in a draw, with two judges scoring it 77-75, one for Johnson, one for Castenda, while the third one scored it 76-76.

Johnson vs Quigley 
In his next fight, Johnson fought Jason Quigley, ranked #5 by the WBC, #8 by the WBA and #14 by the IBF at middleweight. In a dominant performance, Johnson won the fight via ninth-round TKO.

Johnson vs Munguia 
In his next bout, Johnson fought WBC and WBO #1 and IBF #9 contender Jaime Munguia. The fight started off competitively, until the sixth round when Munguia caught Johnson with a vicious uppercut that caused a serious cut on Johnson's upper lip. The doctor decided to stop the fight after the end of the round, and Munguia was awarded the win.

Olympics results
2008 Summer Olympics - Welterweight division
Defeated Rolande Moses (Grenada) - PTS (18-3)
Defeated Olexandr Stretskyy (Ukraine) - PTS 9-4
Lost to Kanat Islam (Kazakhstan) 4-14

Professional boxing record

References

External links
 
Bio
2nd Qualifier
Profile
sports-reference
Tureano Johnson - Profile, News Archive & Current Rankings at Box.Live

1984 births
Sportspeople from Nassau, Bahamas
Welterweight boxers
Living people
Bahamian male boxers
Boxers at the 2002 Commonwealth Games
Boxers at the 2006 Commonwealth Games
Boxers at the 2007 Pan American Games
Boxers at the 2008 Summer Olympics
Olympic boxers of the Bahamas
Commonwealth Games competitors for the Bahamas
Pan American Games competitors for the Bahamas